North Macedonia participated in the Eurovision Song Contest 2021 with the song "Here I Stand" written by Vasil Garvanliev, Borče Kuzmanovski and Davor Jordanovski. The song was performed by Vasil, which is the artistic name of singer Vasil Garvanliev who was internally selected by the North Macedonian broadcaster Macedonian Radio Television (MRT) to compete for North Macedonia at the 2021 contest in Rotterdam, Netherlands, after he was due to compete in the 2020 contest with "You" before the 2020 event's cancellation. Vasil's appointment as the North Macedonian representative was announced on 20 January 2021, while his song, "Here I Stand", was presented to the public on 11 March 2021.

North Macedonia was drawn to compete in the first semi-final of the Eurovision Song Contest which took place on 18 May 2021. Performing during the show in position 6, "Here I Stand" was not announced among the top 10 entries of the first semi-final and therefore did not qualify to compete in the final. It was later revealed that North Macedonia placed fifteenth out of the 16 participating countries in the semi-final with 23 points.

Background

Prior to the 2021 contest, North Macedonia had participated in the Eurovision Song Contest nineteen times since its first entry in  under the provisional appellation "former Yugoslav Republic of Macedonia", abbreviated "FYR Macedonia".

The North Macedonian national broadcaster, Macedonian Radio Television (MRT), broadcasts the event within North Macedonia and organises the selection process for the nation's entry. MRT confirmed their intentions to participate at the 2021 Eurovision Song Contest on 16 September 2020. Between 2008 and 2011, North Macedonia selected their entries using the national final . During this period, the nation failed to qualify to the final on every occasion. After failing to qualify in 2015 where  was used as a national final, the broadcaster internally selected the nation's entry since 2016, resulting in a single qualification to the final during this period in 2019. For 2021, the broadcaster again opted to internally select the North Macedonian entry.

Before Eurovision

Internal selection
On 20 January 2021, MRT confirmed that Vasil would remain as North Macedonia's representative for the Eurovision Song Contest 2021. In regards to his re-selection as the Macedonian entrant, Vasil stated: "Rarely in life do we get not just one, but three chances to make our dream come true. In 2019 I proudly stood behind Tamara Todevska, in 2020 I dedicated everything to "You" - but Covid said no! In 2021 I am using my personal journey and story to place my heart in your hands through my voice. Never stop believing, dreaming and fighting for what you stand for in life. Dreams do come true!" A submission period was opened on the same day for interested composers to submit their songs until 27 January 2021.

On 20 January 2021, it was announced that Vasil would perform the song "Here I Stand" at the Eurovision Song Contest 2021. "Here I Stand" was presented to the public on 11 March 2021 through the release of the official music video via the official Eurovision Song Contest's YouTube channel. The song was composed by Vasil, Borče Kuzmanovski, Davor Jordanovski with lyrics written by Vasil himself, and featured backing vocals performed by former members of the Chicago Children Choir.

Music video controversy 
The music video of "Here I Stand" led to controversy due to a piece of art in the venue where the video was shot that resembled the colors of the Bulgarian flag; Vasil previously confirmed that he holds Bulgarian citizenship, due to his grandmother's origin. The music video was eventually edited as a result of public pressure and Vasil stated during an interview to the Macedonian newspaper Sloboden Pechat that the triptych artwork in the video, displayed in the Daut Pasha's Bath in Skopje with three vertical panels of cream, green and a rusty orange colour, "had no deliberate connection with the Bulgarian flag". He also added that it is a "creation of the author Janeta Vangeli and is inspired by Jesus Christ" and that "the Bulgarian flag [colors] are horizontal".

In an Instagram post, Vasil wrote: "I am a music ambassador, and in music there is no religion, politics, orientation, race or color. I had absolutely no intentions to hurt anybody. Quite the opposite! I am so proud of this project which not only embodies me, but my country and culture – musicians and featured artists in the gallery. I do not apologise for being me. I never will – I didn't have a choice in that. However, if I hurt anybody in any way, from the bottom of my heart... I am sorry. Forgive me". MRT formed a special commission to decide whether Vasil should withdraw from Eurovision Song Contest over claims he had spread "Bulgarian propaganda", later deciding that he would be allowed to participate. The background of the conflict is due to the complicated Bulgaria–North Macedonia relations.

At Eurovision 

According to Eurovision rules, all nations with the exceptions of the host country and the "Big Five" (France, Germany, Italy, Spain and the United Kingdom) are required to qualify from one of two semi-finals in order to compete in the final; the top ten countries from each semi-final progress to the final. The European Broadcasting Union (EBU) split up the competing countries into six different pots based on voting patterns from previous contests, with countries with favourable voting histories put into the same pot. The semi-final allocation draw held for the Eurovision Song Contest 2020 on 28 January 2020 was used for the 2021 contest, which North Macedonia was placed into the first semi-final, which was held on 18 May 2021, and was scheduled to perform in the first half of the show.

Once all the competing songs for the 2021 contest had been released, the running order for the semi-finals was decided by the shows' producers rather than through another draw, so that similar songs were not placed next to each other. North Macedonia was set to perform in position 6, following the entry from Australia and before the entry from Ireland.

The two semi-finals and final were broadcast in North Macedonia on MRT 1 and MRT 2 with commentary by Eli Tanaskovska. The Macedonian spokesperson, who announced the top 12-point score awarded by the North Macedonian jury during the final, was Vane Markoski.

Semi-final 

Vasil took part in technical rehearsals on 8 and 12 May, followed by dress rehearsals on 17 and 18 May. This included the jury show on 17 May where the professional juries of each country watched and voted on the competing entries.

The North Macedonian performance featured Vasil performing alone on stage in a black suit which he opened towards the end to reveal a disco ball chestplate. The stage was dark in the beginning with a single spotlight on Vasil and the performance featured holographic effects, including a light on Vasil's heart which transformed into a larger effect that he interacted with using his hand. The artistic director for the North Macedonian performance was Tine Matulessy.

At the end of the show, North Macedonia was not announced among the top 10 entries in the first semi-final and therefore failed to qualify to compete in the final. It was later revealed that North Macedonia placed fifteenth in the semi-final, receiving a total of 23 points: 11 points from the televoting and 12 points from the juries.

Voting 
Voting during the three shows involved each country awarding two sets of points from 1-8, 10 and 12: one from their professional jury and the other from televoting. Each nation's jury consisted of five music industry professionals who are citizens of the country they represent, with a diversity in gender and age represented. The judges assess each entry based on the performances during the second Dress Rehearsal of each show, which takes place the night before each live show, against a set of criteria including: vocal capacity; the stage performance; the song's composition and originality; and the overall impression by the act. Jury members may only take part in panel once every three years, and are obliged to confirm that they are not connected to any of the participating acts in a way that would impact their ability to vote impartially. Jury members should also vote independently, with no discussion of their vote permitted with other jury members. The exact composition of the professional jury, and the results of each country's jury and televoting were released after the grand final; the individual results from each jury member were also released in an anonymised form.

Below is a breakdown of points awarded to North Macedonia and awarded by North Macedonia in the first semi-final and grand final of the contest, and the breakdown of the jury voting and televoting conducted during the two shows:

Points awarded to North Macedonia

Points awarded by North Macedonia

Detailed voting results 
The following members comprised the North Macedonia jury:
 
 Jana Burčeska (jury member in semi-final 1)
 Lara Ivanova
 Erhan Shukri
 Ile Spasev
 Darko Tasev (jury member in the final)

References 

2021
Countries in the Eurovision Song Contest 2021
Eurovision